Alex Pechin (born November 18, 1996) is an American football punter. He played college football for the Bucknell Bison.

High school career 
Pechin played high school football at Unionville High School in Kennett Square, Pennsylvania.

College career 
Pechin led the FCS in punting average his senior season, with an average of 47.3 yards per punt. For his efforts he was named FCS Punter of the Year. He participated in the 2020 East-West Shrine Bowl on January 18, 2020. He was named to the STATS FCS All-Decade Team. Pechin was the only player from the Patriot League to attend the 2020 NFL Scouting Combine.

Professional career

References 

Living people
American football punters
Bucknell Bison football players
1996 births
Players of American football from Pennsylvania